Ingvi Þór Guðmundsson (born 13 July 1998) is an Icelandic basketball player for Grindavík in the Icelandic Úrvalsdeild karla.

Career
Ingvi played his first game for the Grindavík senior team at the end of the 2013–2014 season. During the 2017–18 season, he averaged 10.8 points per game. The following season, he joined Saint Louis University. During his first season he suffered through the bout of appendicitis, lost approximately 10 pounds and missed a considerable amount of practice. He ended up going to a hospital on November 30 and had his appendix removed. He withdrew from the college in January 2019, after appearing in two games, and rejoined Grindavík.

After averaging a career high of 14.4points, 5.1 rebounds and 5.0 assists during the 2019-20 season, Ingvi Þór signed with Dresden Titans in August 2020. He left the club in October 2020.

In December 2020, Ingvi Þór signed with Haukar. He left the team in February 2021 at the behest of head coach Israel Martín, after appearing in 9 games where he averaged 10.1 points, 3.6 rebounds and 2.9 assists, and joined Þór Akureyri. He appeared in three games for Þór, averaging 17.3 points, 5.0. rebounds and 3.3 assists before missing the rest of the season due to a concussion he suffered in a game against Stjarnan.

Personal life
Ingvi Þór is the son of Stefanía S. Jónsdóttir, a former member of the Icelandic women's national basketball team, and Guðmundur Bragason, a former professional basketball player and the highest capped player in the Icelandic men's national basketball team history. His older brother is Icelandic national team member Jón Axel Guðmundsson.

References

External sites
Icelandic statistics at Icelandic Basketball Association
Profile at Proballers.com
College profile

1998 births
Living people
Guards (basketball)
Ingvi Þór Guðmundsson
Ingvi Þór Guðmundsson
Ingvi Þór Guðmundsson
Ingvi Þór Guðmundsson
Ingvi Þór Guðmundsson
Saint Louis Billikens men's basketball players
Ingvi Þór Guðmundsson
Ingvi Þór Guðmundsson